Epicrionops marmoratus, the marbled caecilian, is a species of caecilian in the family Rhinatrematidae. It is endemic to Ecuador and only known from its type locality, Santo Domingo de los Colorados, and from near Mindo in the Pichincha Province in north-western Ecuador.  It is a poorly known species that might be a junior synonym of Epicrionops bicolor.

Description
Epicrionops marmoratus is a small but robust-bodied caecilian. Based on two specimens of unspecific sex, adults measure  in snout–vent length. The coloration is whitish cream with lavender spots and spots, which are coarser in the mid-ventral region and lighter on the back, while the lower parts of the sides are less pigmented. The eggs are presumably laid on land while the larvae are  believed to develop in streams. Threats to this species are unknown, but could involve habitat loss caused by livestock rearing, agricultural activities, and water pollution. It is protected by the Mindo-Nambillo Protected Forest.

References

Epicrionops
Amphibians of the Andes
Amphibians of Ecuador
Endemic fauna of Ecuador
Amphibians described in 1968
Taxa named by Edward Harrison Taylor
Taxonomy articles created by Polbot